A circle jerk, also sometimes spelled circlejerk, is a sexual practice in which a group of men or boys form a circle and masturbate themselves or each other. In the metaphorical sense, the term is used to refer to self-congratulatory behavior or discussion among a group of people, usually in reference to a "boring or time-wasting meeting or other event".

Circle jerks often feature a competitive element, with the "winner" being the participant able to ejaculate first, last, or farthest depending on the pre-established rules. They can serve as an introduction to sexual relations with other males, or as a sexual outlet at an age or situation when regular sexual activity with another person is not possible. 

While circle jerks feature a homoerotic element, some analysts interpret adolescent boys' group activities such as circle jerks as an effort to establish heterosexual, masculine dominance within the group. However, American sociologist Bernard Lefkowitz asserts that what actually motivates participation is the desire for friends to witness and acknowledge one's sexual prowess, helping to counter teenage feelings of inadequacy related to sexual activity.

See also
 Bukkake
 Daisy chain
 Soggy biscuit

References

Group sex
Sexuality and society
Male masturbation
Male homosexuality